Trustees of Labour were government-appointed officials in Nazi Germany in charge of labour relations supervised by the Reich Ministry of Labour. Established by the Trustees of Labour law of 19 May 1933, the Trustees of Labour were responsible for the maintenance of industrial peace, i.e., defining minimum (and from 1938 also maximum) wages, resolving individual conflicts and overseeing the establishment of Councils of Trust in businesses and companies as mandated by the Labour organization law of 20 January 1934.

Sources
Trustees of Labour law 
Labour organization law

References
Tim Mason (1993): Social Policy in the Third Reich. The Working Class and the ‘national community’. Translated by John Broadwin, Berg: Oxford, New York, pp. 104, 135, 176.

Economy of Nazi Germany
Labor relations organizations
1933 establishments in Germany
Corporate governance